Fox was a British television drama series produced by Euston Films and Thames Television for the ITV network in 1980. Consisting of thirteen episodes, it recounted the lives of the titular Fox family, who lived in Clapham in South London and had gangland connections. It was notable in that it was an early work that featured the criminal as the protagonist.

The series was written by Trevor Preston, produced by Verity Lambert and directed by Jim Goddard.

Goddard noted that a dominant theme of the show was loyalty.

The show aired on Monday nights, but received fewer viewers than BBC's Yes, Minister.

Plot summary 

Billy Fox is outwardly a retired Covent Garden market porter, but is involved in crime in London's East End.

Cast

The Fox family
 Billy – Peter Vaughan
 Connie – Elizabeth Spriggs
 Kenny – Ray Winstone
 Joey – Larry Lamb
 Vin – Bernard Hill
 Ray – Derrick O'Connor
 Phil – Eamon Boland
 Renie – Rosemary Martin
 Andy – Richard Weinbaum
 Nan – Cindy O'Callaghan
 Jenny – Gail Shaw
 Frank – Sidney Livingstone

List of episodes
 "King Billy"
 "Arched Fingers for Bach, Flat Fingers for Love"
 "Pugilism Not Vandalism"
 "It's All Them Psychia-Whatever-You-Call-It Books He Reads"
 "Shim-Me-Sha-Wabble"
 "Stick or Twist"
 "The Perfect Scapegoat Syndrome"
 "'If It's Good Enough for New Orleans, It's Good Enough for Clapham"
 "Fox Big 'F' – Family"
 "Just an Iron Monkey"
 "Just Another Villain in a Cheap Suit"
 "Oh Dear – Oh Dear – Oh Dear!"
 "The Family ... and the Future"

References

External links
 
 British Film Institute Screen Online

ITV television dramas
Television shows set in London
1980s British drama television series
1980 British television series debuts
1980 British television series endings
Television series by Fremantle (company)
Television shows produced by Thames Television
English-language television shows
Television series by Euston Films